The 1990 Tour of the Basque Country was the 30th edition of the Tour of the Basque Country cycle race and was held from 2 April to 6 April 1990. The race started in Zestoa and finished at Barrendiola. The race was won by Julián Gorospe of the Banesto team.

General classification

References

1990
Bas